Plitvica is a river in northern Croatia, a right tributary of Drava.

Plitvica rises in the hilly areas of Maceljsko gorje, near of the eponymous village of Plitvica Voćanska, near Donja Voća. It flows southeast until it turns east near Maruševec, and continues through the lowland south of Varaždin and parallel to Drava, through Sveti Đurđ (north of Ludbreg), until it merges into Drava north of Veliki Bukovec.

References

Rivers of Croatia